This is a list of the 25 highest mountains in Wales.

List of highest mountains in Wales

References 

Landmarks in Wales
Mountains and hills of Wales
Marilyns of Wales
Climbing areas of Wales
Hewitts of Wales
Lists of mountains and hills of Wales
Wales
Welsh peaks by listing